The Tropical Warm Pool (TWP) or Indo-Pacific Warm Pool is a mass of ocean water located in the western Pacific Ocean and eastern Indian Ocean which consistently exhibits the highest water temperatures over the largest expanse of the Earth's surface. Its intensity and extent appear to oscillate over a time period measured in decades.

The Indo-Pacific warm pool has been warming rapidly and expanding during the recent decades, largely from climate change in response to increased carbon emissions from fossil fuel burning. The warm pool expanded double its size, from an area of 22 million km2 during 1900–1980, to an area of 40 million km2 during 1981–2018. This expansion of the warm pool has allowed more cyclones, as well as altered global rainfall patterns and variations , by changing the life cycle of the Madden Julian Oscillation (MJO), which is the most dominant mode of weather fluctuation originating in the tropics.

See also
 Maritime Continent

References

Regional climate effects
Tropical meteorology